More Fool Me may refer to:
 More Fool Me, a song by the band Genesis released in 1973 on the album Selling England by the Pound
 More Fool Me (memoir), the 2014 autobiography of Stephen Fry (his third)